Atarneus, called Atarneus sub Pitanem to distinguish it from the other city of the name, was a town of ancient Aeolis near Pitane.

Its site is located near Gavurgör, Asiatic Turkey.

References

Populated places in ancient Aeolis
Former populated places in Turkey